Zuel is a surname. People with the name include:

Bernard Zuel, Australian music journalist
Dr. Doris Zuel, alter ego of superhero adversary Giganta
Henni Zuël, English golfer

See also
Zuel, a small settlement in Cortina d'Ampezzo, Italy 
ZUEL, abbreviation of the Zhongnan University of Economics and Law